The St. Francis Brooklyn Terriers women's basketball program represents St. Francis College (SFC) in intercollegiate women's basketball. The team has been a member of the Division I Northeast Conference since 1988.  The Terriers currently play at the Activity Resource Center at Pratt Institute (aka "The ARC") in the Clinton Hill neighborhood of Brooklyn, New York. Through the start of the 2022–23 season, the team had played at the Peter Aquilone Court at the Generoso Pope Athletic Complex on SFC's former campus in Brooklyn Heights. At the end of the 2021–22 school year, SFC moved to a new campus on Livingston Street in Downtown Brooklyn that has no athletic facilities; SFC arranged to use The ARC on at least a temporary basis.

History
The women's team kicked off intercollegiate athletics at St. Francis College in 1973. The first head coach was Christine McGowan, who led them to a 9–5 record. Since the 1988–89 season the women's basketball team has been a part of the Northeast Conference. The programs first Conference tournament Championship and NCAA Tournament participation occurred in 2015 when both were accomplished.

John Thurston era

From 2012 until 2018, John Thurston was the head coach of the St. Francis College Terriers. After the 2017-18 season Thurston retired. While at the helm of the Terriers, Thurston accumulated a 73–110 record, the highest win total of any coach in program history. Thurston also was the first coach in program history to win a Northeast Conference tournament Championship and participate in an NCAA tournament. Also under Thurston, the 2013–14 squad set the single-season program record with 19 victories.

In 2012, Thurston replaced Brenda Milano, who coached the Terriers for 9 seasons leading them to the NEC playoffs only 3 times. After not making the NEC Tournament for four consecutive seasons, from 2008 to 2011, first-year head coach Thurston was able to secure the 7th seed in 2012. The Terriers also won more than 10 games for the first time in 5 years that season and had an overall record of 11–19.
For the 2013–14 season the Terriers made a pair of appearances on ESPN3 for the first time in their history. The 2013–14 Terriers improved to 6–2 on the season for the first time since the 1976–77 season. After going 11–2 by winning 5 straight games, the Terriers for the first time in program history were ranked inside the top 25 of a national basketball poll at 25th in the CollegeInsider.com Top 25 Mid-Major Poll. The 2013–14 squad set the single-season school record with 19 wins during the year. The Terriers also notched 10 conference wins, which was the  most in St. Francis Brooklyn women's basketball history to that point.

The 2014–15 team was invited to participate in the 2014 Preseason WNIT, the first in the program's history. They also won the 2014–15 Northeast Conference Women's Basketball Championship after defeating Robert Morris on the road. St. Francis Brooklyn is the first team in the conference to go on the road and win all three tournament games to be crowned Northeast Conference Champions. They are also the first number 5 seed to take home the championship trophy. This was the first championship for St. Francis women's basketball in program history. The women's basketball team also made its first NCAA tournament appearance and lost to eventual champions Connecticut.

During the 2015–16 season the Terriers excelled in the classroom and posted the number one ranking in the NCAA for team GPA. Additionally, the Terriers for four consecutive years have won Northeast Conference Top Academic Team Awards, four consecutive Northeast Conference Sportsmanship Awards, and four consecutive years finishing among the top five teams in the Women's Basketball Coaches Association Team GPA rankings.

Linda Cimino era

Cimino was formally announced as the head coach of the Terriers on May 21, 2018. She became the 13th head coach in program history. Previously, Cimino was the head coach at Binghamton. In Cimino's first year at the helm, she set the Terrier record for conference wins in a season, 12, which was previously held by John Thurston's 2013–14 squad that won 10.

Season by season results

Coaching history

Tournament results

NCAA
The Terriers appeared in their first NCAA Tournament in 2015, a 33–89 loss to first seed and eventual champions Connecticut in the Albany Regional at Storrs, Connecticut.

Rivalry
The fiercest rival of the Terriers are the Long Island University, they have competed annually since their first match on February 21, 1975. During the 1993–94 season the women's basketball programs of St. Francis College and Long Island University contested their first official Battle of Brooklyn match. As of the 2019-20 season, the Terriers lead the series 14–13.

Terrier records

In the 2018-19 season, Amy O'Neill became the first Terrier to record a triple-double. She did so twice during the season, first at Sacred Heart (2/2/19) and again at home against LIU Brooklyn (2/16/19). O'Neill also led the country by averaging 8.6 assists per game.

Accolades

Northeast Conference (1986–present)

Terriers in professional leagues
Amy O'Neill ('19), signed with the Sandringham Sabres of the NBL1.
Alex Delaney ('18), signed with the Mackay Meteorettes of the Queensland Basketball League in Australia.
Leah Fechko ('16), signed with the women's Killester Basketball Club of the Premier League in Ireland.      
Eilidh Simpson ('15), signed with CD Zamarat of the Liga Femenina de Baloncesto in Spain.

Retired numbers

The St. Francis Brooklyn women's basketball program retired their first two numbers in 2018. The ceremony's coincided with the 50th anniversary of St. Francis College being a coeducational institution. Zatorski's number 15 was retired on December 15, 2018 during halftime of a Terriers game. Zatorski broke various Terrier records while she was playing and still holds the record for most field goals in a season with 209 in 1977-78. Erving-Schiera's number 40 was retired on February 9, 2019. Erving-Schiera is the programs leading scorer and rebounder.

References

External links